Darko Radovanović (21 September 1975 – 11 June 2011) was a Serbian singer popular in Serbia and the other former Yugoslav republics.

He died on 11 June 2011, together with his manager, Aleksandar Milošević, in a traffic accident on the bypass around Belgrade, near the village of Dobanovci. He was buried on June 14, 2011 at the New Cemetery in Sremska Mitrovica.

He recorded a duet with Ivana Selakov "Ako je do mene" which was a big hit in 2009. The greatest hits of his career are songs like "Da mi je", "Ako je do mene", "Sanjam te", "Dukat", "Vreme da se rastaje" and "E moja ti".

Discography

 Darko Radovanović (2005)
 Dosije (2007)
 Dukat (2010)

References

1975 births
2011 deaths
Road incident deaths in Serbia
Musicians from Novi Sad
Serbian folk-pop singers
21st-century Serbian male singers
Serbian pop singers